The Dârjov is a left tributary of the river Olt in Romania. It discharges into the Olt in Ipotești.

References

Rivers of Romania
Rivers of Olt County